El Salvador Symphony Orchestra (Orquesta Sinfónica de El Salvador; OSES) is the national symphony orchestra of El Salvador. Founded in 1922, by Paul Müller, it is one of Central America's oldest orchestras. Originally formed as the Banda de los Supremos Poderes (Supreme Powers Band), it was renamed the Orquesta Sinfónica del Ejército (Army Symphony Orchestra), before taking its current name. Esteban Servellón and Humberto Pacas have served as its conductors. The OSES was preceded by two earlier classical music groups, the Philharmonic Society of El Salvador (1875) and the National Orchestral Society (1910). OSES is funded by government and private sources.

References

Bibliography

External links
Official website (in Spanish)

1922 establishments in El Salvador
Symphony orchestras
Musical groups established in 1922